This is a list of the 179 members of the Parliament of Denmark in the 2019 to 2022 session. They were elected at the 2019 Danish general election. Their term has ended on 1 November 2022, the date of the 2022 Danish general election.

Election results

Seat distribution
Below is the distribution of the 179 seats as it appeared after the 2019 election, as well as the current distribution.

Parliament members elected at the June 2019 election

Party and member changes after the June 2019 elections

Party changes
Below are all parliament members that have joined another party or become independent during the term.

Simon Emil Ammitzbøll-Bille created Forward in October 2019 and dissolved the party a year later in October 2020. During his time in his new party, the Folketing considered him to be outside a group. Uffe Elbæk, Sikander Siddique and Susanne Zimmer created Independent Greens in September 2020. The same was the case for Lars Løkke Rasmussen, who founded the Moderates in June 2021. The Independent Greens became an official group in the Folketing after they had collected the required signatures to be able to run in the next Folketing election.

On 18 August 2021, the Conservative People's Party told Naser Khader that he couldn't continue in the party, after allegations that Khader had been responsible for several cases of sexual harassment. Khader accepted this and left the party.

Lasting member changes
Below are member changes that will last through the entire term.

Temporary member changes 
Below are temporary member replacements during the term.

Notes

References

 
2019–2022